The 33rd Logistic and Tactical Support Regiment "Ambrosiano" is a military logistics regiment of the Italian Army based in Solbiate Olona in Lombardy. The regiment is operationally assigned to the NRDC-ITA Support Brigade and provides the necessary logistics and security assets for the NATO Rapid Deployable Corps – Italy to operate. The regiment was formed on 16 Juni 2002 and on 27 October 2006 received the war flag, traditions and coat of arms of the 33rd Maneuver Logistic Regiment "Ambrosiano".

History 
On 1 January 1982 the 3rd Maneuver Logistic Battalion was formed in Milan with personnel and materiel of the III Supply, Repairs, Recovery Unit of the III Army Corps. Initially the battalion consisting of a command, command and services company, a supply company, and a maintenance company. On 1 July of the same year the battalion received a medium transport company and a mixed transport company from the 3rd Army Corps Transport Group "Fulvia", which had been disbanded. On the same date the battalion was renamed 3rd Maneuver Logistic Battalion "Fulvia".

On 1 November 1986 the battalion was renamed 33rd Maneuver Logistic Battalion "Ambrosiano" after Saint Ambrose of Milan, the patron saint of Milan. The battalion was augmented with an additional mixed transport company, two armored transport platoons, and a multi-role helicopter section. On 3 July 1987 the battalion received its flag.

On 30 April 1993 the battalion was elevated to 33rd Logistic Maneuver Regiment "Ambrosiano" without changing size of composition. On 1 October 1997 the 3rd Army Corps was renamed Projection Forces Command. On 31 July 2001 the regiment was reorganized as Rapid Reaction Corps Command Unit and the flag of the 33rd Logistic Maneuver Regiment "Ambrosiano" was transferred on 3 August 2001 to the Shrine of the Flags in the Vittoriano in Rome.

On 1 November 2001 the unit was transferred to the Rapid Reaction Corps' Signal Brigade. On 16 June 2002 the unit was renamed Logistic and Tactical Support Regiment. On 16 April 2006 the regiment retrieved the flag of the 33rd Logistic Maneuver Regiment "Ambrosiano" in the Shrine of the Flags and the flag returned to the regiment on 27 October 2006.

On 1 June 2022 the regiment was renamed 33rd Logistic and Tactical Support Regiment "Ambrosiano".

Current structure 
As of 2022 the 33rd Logistic and Tactical Support Regiment "Ambrosiano" consists of:

  Regimental Command, in Solbiate Olona
 Command and Logistic Support Company
 Tactical and Logistic Support Battalion
 Deployment Support Company
 Transport Company
 3rd Bersaglieri Company "Celere"
 Commissariat Company

The Regimental Command consists of the Commandant's and Personnel Office, the Operations, Training and Information Office, the Logistic Office, and the Administration Office. The Command and Logistic Support Company fields the following platoons: C3 Platoon, Transport and Materiel Platoon, Medical Platoon, and Commissariat Platoon.

See also 
 Military logistics

External links
Italian Army Website: 33° Reggimento Supporto Tattico e Logistico "Ambrosiano"

References 

Logistic Regiments of Italy
Military units and formations established in 2002